The Socialist Labour Party (SLP) is a socialist political party in the United Kingdom. The party was established in 1996 and is led by Arthur Scargill, a former Labour Party member and the former leader of the National Union of Mineworkers. The party's name highlights its commitment to socialism and acknowledges Clause IV of the Labour Party's former constitution, as fundamental to the party's identity.

The SLP advocates economic localism, supported Britain's exit from the European Union and is in favour of reopening the mines.

According to accounts filed with the Electoral Commission for 2019, the Socialist Labour Party had 315 members.

History 
Arthur Scargill founded the Socialist Labour Party in 1996 as a reaction to Tony Blair's rewrite of Clause IV in the Labour Party's constitution a year earlier, seen as a final rejection of a commitment to socialism. The SLP advocates the public ownership of leading industries privatised under Conservative Prime Minister Margaret Thatcher during the 1980s, with the policy being maintained by her successor John Major and then advocated by Labour Party leader Tony Blair in his re-write of Clause IV.

In 2004, a purge of a Marxist-Leninist faction, the previously external Association of Communist Workers, over the issue of lack of support for relations with North Korea, led to the formation of the Communist Party of Great Britain (Marxist–Leninist).

The party attracted trade union figures such as Mick Rix and Bob Crow.

So far the party's only councillors have been defectors from Labour. In early 2014, three Labour councillors in Barking and Dagenham joined the SLP  though subsequently all lost their seats in the 2014 United Kingdom local elections to Labour.

On 2 April 2019, two Labour Party councillors sitting on Hartlepool Borough Council, one of them the ceremonial mayor, defected to the SLP complaining of racism and homophobia in Hartlepool Labour. Another councillor resigned and joined the party after being suspended by Hartlepool Labour amidst claims he helped one of the defectors in his election campaign. The defections gave the Socialist Labour Party its first councillors since 2014. While in the 2019 United Kingdom local elections both Hartlepool councillors lost their seats, a week later, with Labour having lost overall control of the council, the SLP gained a further three councillors, including the leader of the council. However, the party contested only one Hartlepool seat in the 2021 local elections, coming last, and no longer has any elected representation.

The Socialist Labour Party campaigned for Britain to leave the European Union during the 2016 United Kingdom European Union membership referendum. The party also advocated a unilateral withdrawal without invoking Article 50.

Electoral performance

Election results

House of Commons

At the 2001 general election, the party took about 3% of the vote in seats where it stood candidates.

The party received its highest share of the vote in an individual constituency at the 2005 general election, when it gained 14.2% of the votes cast in Glasgow North East.

The Socialist Labour Party did not contest the 2004 European Parliament election, but fielded a full list of candidates for England, Scotland and Wales in the 2009 European Parliament election, where it took 173,115 votes, or 1.1% of the national vote.

2010 United Kingdom general election

The Socialist Labour Party ran 23 candidates in the 2010 general election, who received a total of 7,196 votes, less than 0.1% of the UK national vote. All lost their deposits. The best results were those of Kai Andersen in Liverpool West Derby (614 votes - 1.7%) and Ken Capstick in Barnsley East (601 votes - 1.6%). In the local elections held on the same day, Andersen also received 244 votes (4.2%) in the Croxteth ward of Liverpool and in 2012 received 410 votes (14.76%) coming second in the same ward.

2011 Scottish Parliament general election

The Socialist Labour Party contested all electoral regions of the Scottish Parliament in 2011, increasing its share of the vote from 0.7% in 2007 to 0.9%. Most other political parties saw a decrease in their vote share due to the landslide victory by the Scottish National Party (SNP). The SLP beat all other left-wing opposition for the first time, as well as parties like the British National Party (BNP).

2011 National Assembly for Wales election

The Socialist Labour Party increased its share of the vote from 1.2% in 2007 to 2.4%, giving the SLP the second biggest percentage gain of the total votes cast in the election. It outperformed other small left-wing parties as well as the BNP. The SLP also received more votes than the Wales Green Party in two of the five regions of Wales.
At the local elections on the same day the SLPs Kenny Spain received 251 votes (27%) coming second in the Rossmore ward of Cheshire West and Chester.

UK local elections 2014 

Although the SLPs three councillors, defectors from Labour in the Borough of Barking and Dagenham, lost their seats, the party's vote in the local elections of 22 May showed an upward trend. Its highest votes were polled in Barnsley where Terry Robinson received 105 votes (8.5%) in Worsborough ward while Frank Watson received 178 (9%) in Stairfoot. Elsewhere, John Tyrrell received 392 votes (6.6%) in Birmingham's Handsworth Wood ward while Barbara Bryan received 129 (6.3%) in the Linacre ward of Sefton.

UK general elections 2015 and 2017 

In the General Election of 2015 the SLP stood seven candidates all in Wales. Its best result, with 697 votes (1.8%), was achieved in Torfaen by John Cox. In 2017 the best result from its three contests was won in Birmingham Perry Barr where Shangara Bhatoe received 592 votes (1.3%).

UK local elections 2018 

The party fielded only three candidates, all in the North West of England. Its share of the vote ranged between 4% and 9%. Its best result was registered in the Appleton ward of Halton, where a former Independent, Vic Turton, obtained 9.3% of the vote (97 votes).

UK general election 2019 

The SLP only stood one candidate, Kevin Cranney in Hartlepool. Cranney gained 494 votes (1.2%)

See also
 Republicanism in the United Kingdom

Notes

External links
Socialist Labour Party
Party Broadcast for the 2009 European Parliament Election

 
Eurosceptic parties in the United Kingdom